Robusta can refer to:
 Robusta coffee, the product of Coffea robusta/Coffea canephora, used to make coffee
 Cubesat ROBUSTA, a satellite developed by students at Montpellier 2 University

See also 
 Robustus (disambiguation)